Lendrum is a surname. Notable people with the surname include:

Bob Lendrum (born 1948), New Zealand rugby union player
J. Tom Lendrum (born 1927), American politician